Brassinolide is a plant hormone.  The first isolated brassinosteroid, it was discovered when it was shown that pollen from rapeseed (Brassica napus) could promote stem elongation and cell division.  The biologically active component was isolated and named brassinolide.

References 

Plant hormones
Steroids
Epsilon-lactones
Plant growth regulators